A Son of the Sahara is a 1924 American silent drama film produced and directed by Edwin Carewe and co-directed with René Plaissetty. It stars Claire Windsor and Bert Lytell. First National handled the distribution of the film.

Plot
As described in a film magazine review, Raoul Le Breton is brought up as the son of a sheik of an Arab tribe, although he has been to college. He falls in love with Barbara Barbier, who first accepts and later dismisses him when she learns of his native birth. Back in the desert, Raoul plans his revenge. In a raid he captures Barbara, her father, and Captain Jean Duval, who is a rival. She is sold as a slave but is secretly purchased by Raoul. French troops rescue the captives, but in the meantime it transpires that Raoul is the offspring of white parents, and he and Barbara find happiness together.

Cast

Production
A Son of the Sahara was shot on location in Algeria with an American cast.

Critical review
Of the "Sheik" films of the 1920s, the plot of A Son of the Sahara was among the more racist in that Barbara, the European woman, completely rejects any romantic interest in Raoul until the very end of the film where it is established that he lacks any Arab ancestry and is fully French.

Preservation
With no copies of A Son of the Sahara located in any film archives, it is a lost film. However, a trailer of the film survives in the Library of Congress.

See also
Racism in early American film

References

External links

Stills at Claire Windsor website
Still at silentfilmstillarchive.com

1924 films
American silent feature films
First National Pictures films
Films directed by Edwin Carewe
Lost American films
American black-and-white films
Silent American drama films
1924 drama films
1924 lost films
Lost drama films
1920s American films